The Gangwon campaign was a campaign by the Japanese army to pacify Gangwon province, Korea in 1592, just after the beginning of the Seven Year War.

Timeline
Ukita Hideie was appointed as supreme commander of the Japanese army in Korea, allotted to Mori Yoshinari's Fourth Division to be Kato Kiyomasa's rear guard by pacifying Gangwon Province.

The Battle of Yeogang (Hangul : 여강) on May 22, 1592*
Won Ho VS Mori Yoshinari

The Fall of Hoeyang Castle (Hangul : 회양성 Hanja : 淮陽) on June 5, 1592*
Mori Yoshinari VS Kim Yeon-gwang (Hangul : 김연광 Hanja : 金鍊光) (Korean Regular Army : 조선육군)

Japanese's Fourth Division occupation of Gangwon Province in 1592
Japanese commander and their forts (all of which were captured Korean castles) :

Itō Suketaka - Cheorwon
Akizuki Tanenaga - Wonju
Shimazu Tadatsune - Chuncheon
Shimazu Yoshihiro - Yongpyon and then Kumhwa

Mori Yoshinari's pacification of Gangwon Province
The province of Gangwon had been very peaceful following its occupation by Mori Yoshinari's Fourth Division, but after a few months guerilla activity erupted.

Aftermath : Japanese Evacuation of Gangwon Province

References

Stephen Turnbull, "Samurai Invasion - Japan's Korean War 1592-1598", Cassel & Co, 2002

Notes
(*) According to Chinese Lunar Calendar

See also
History of Korea
Military history of Korea
Military history of Japan
Righteous army

Military history of Japan
Battles of the Japanese invasions of Korea (1592–1598)
Military history of Korea
Gangwon Province, South Korea
1592 in Asia